The Bradfield Highway is a  highway in Sydney, New South Wales and is one of the shortest highways in Australia.

The highway was opened on 19 March 1932 and was named in honour of Dr John Bradfield. As a government-appointed civil engineer, Bradfield oversaw the tendering process for the construction of the Sydney Harbour Bridge, and as the NSW Public Works Department chief engineer had oversight of the bridge design and construction. Amid some controversy, Bradfield was also considered to be the co-designer of the bridge's arch design, along with Dorman Long and Sir Ralph Freeman.

Route

The southern terminus of the Bradfield Highway is at the north-eastern end of the Western Distributor in the Sydney central business district and crosses the Sydney Harbour Bridge, with its northern terminus at the Warringah Freeway in North Sydney, north of the Pacific Highway exit at the Mount Street ramp. Prior to the construction of the Warringah Freeway in 1968, all traffic at the northern terminus of the Bradfield Highway was directed to or from the Pacific Highway, via North Sydney.

The Bradfield Highway currently carries six lanes of traffic across the eight lane Sydney Harbour Bridge. The other two traffic lanes on the Sydney Harbour Bridge are used for the Cahill Expressway, which run only southbound on the bridge. During peak periods three out of the six lanes are reversed, giving a 2 × 4, 3 × 3 or 5 × 1 flow. The default is 4 × 2, being four north lanes and two south lanes (with the additional two lanes of the Cahill Expressway providing an even flow of traffic). The direction of the lanes is indicated by electronic signage above each lane. The lanes are numbered one to six from west to east. Lane six was also reversed prior to 1990 during the evening rush hour, giving a 6 × 0 flow, however this no longer occurs because of changes made to the Warringah Freeway to accommodate the Sydney Harbour Tunnel.

In 2001, 159,587 vehicles a day used the highway.

In August 1992 the Sydney Harbour Tunnel opened which helped to relieve congestion on the Bradfield Highway.

The Bradfield Highway is a designated stock route.

Road toll
A road toll is levied on all vehicles travelling across the Sydney Harbour Bridge, via the Bradfield Highway or the Cahill Expressway in a southerly direction only. A toll also applies for vehicles travelling in the same direction using the Sydney Harbour Tunnel. In November 2014 NSW Roads & Maritime Services proposed an to upgrade the tolling infrastructure which included the construction new tolling gantries at four locations on the northern approaches to the bridge, covering the Bradfield Highway, Cahill Expressway and the Sydney Harbour Tunnel, and the removal of existing tolling gantries at both the northern and southern bridge termini.

Exits and interchanges

See also

References

External links

Highways in Sydney
Toll roads in Australia